Sandy Ground is a village and one of the fourteen Districts of Anguilla, and its  main port. The long curved beach is backed by high cliffs and a disused salt pond. According to the 2011 census Sandy Ground has a population of 230.

Population

References

External links 

Map of Sandy Ground

Populated places in Anguilla